Malusi Siboto (born 20 August 1987) is a South African cricketer. He was included in the Free State cricket team squad for the 2015 Africa T20 Cup. In August 2017, he was named in the Cape Town Knight Riders' squad for the first season of the T20 Global League. However, in October 2017, Cricket South Africa initially postponed the tournament until November 2018, with it being cancelled soon after.

In June 2018, he was named in the squad for the Highveld Lions team for the 2018–19 season. In October 2018, he was named in Cape Town Blitz's squad for the first edition of the Mzansi Super League T20 tournament. In September 2019, he was named in the squad for the Durban Heat team for the 2019 Mzansi Super League tournament. Later the same month, he was named in North West's squad for the 2019–20 CSA Provincial T20 Cup. In April 2021, he was named in Gauteng's squad, ahead of the 2021–22 cricket season in South Africa.

References

External links
 

1987 births
Living people
Cricketers from Cape Town
South African cricketers
North West cricketers
Knights cricketers
Free State cricketers
Easterns cricketers
Titans cricketers
Lions cricketers
Cape Town Blitz cricketers
Durban Heat cricketers
Gauteng cricketers